Dobrinka is a rural locality (a settlement) and the administrative center of Dobrinsky District of Lipetsk Oblast, Russia, located on the Gryazi–Borisoglebsk railway line, in the upper streams of the Plovutka River. Population: 

It was founded on May 30, 1802 by the settlers from the town of Dobry (now the village of Dobroye) as the village of Dobrinskiye Vyselki.  In 1869, the Gryazi–Borisoglebsk railway was built, and the station of that railway located in the vicinity of the village was also named Dobrinka. By the beginning of the 20th century, the village and the station grew and merged.

In 1967, Dobrinka merged with the village of Chuyevka and was granted urban-type settlement status, which it held until 2005.

References

Rural localities in Lipetsk Oblast
Populated places established in 1802